Lucas Willian Cruzeiro Martins (born 12 May 1995), known as just Lucas Willian, is a Brazilian footballer who plays as a winger for Sportist Svoge.

External links
 

1995 births
Living people
Brazilian footballers
Association football midfielders
Rio Branco Esporte Clube players
FC Arda Kardzhali players
FC Tsarsko Selo Sofia players
PFC Beroe Stara Zagora players
FC Sportist Svoge players
Brazilian expatriate footballers
Brazilian expatriate sportspeople in Bulgaria
Expatriate footballers in Bulgaria
Brazilian expatriate sportspeople in South Korea
Expatriate footballers in South Korea
First Professional Football League (Bulgaria) players
Second Professional Football League (Bulgaria) players
Footballers from Rio de Janeiro (city)